USS Deane has been the name of more than one ship in the United States Navy.

  was a Continental Navy frigate commissioned in 1778.

United States Navy ship names